Meriania panamensis is a species of plant in the family Melastomataceae. It is endemic to Panama.  It is threatened by habitat loss.

References

Endemic flora of Panama
panamensis
Endangered plants
Taxonomy articles created by Polbot